Heider may refer to:

Heider (surname)
Heider Dias Sotero (born 1987), Brazilian footballer
Heider FC, German football club
Heider SV, German football club
Heider Sati

See also
Heider Umland, Ämter in Schleswig-Holstein, Germany
Heider Sati